Route 235 is a Quebec provincial highway located in the Estrie and Montérégie regions in the southeastern part of the province. The highway runs from the Morses Line Border Crossing at the Canada-United States border in Saint-Armand to Yamaska. It overlaps Route 239 in Massueville and Route 137 and Route 116 in Saint-Hyacinthe, Quebec. A small portion of the highway near its northern terminus runs parallel to the Yamaska River.

Municipalities along Route 235
 Saint-Armand
 Bedford
 Sainte-Sabine
 Farnham
 Ange-Gardien
 Saint-Paul-d'Abbotsford
 Saint-Pie
 Saint-Hyacinthe
 Saint-Barnabé-Sud
 Saint-Jude
 Saint-Louis
 Massueville
 Saint-Aimé
 Yamaska

See also
 List of Quebec provincial highways

References

External links 
 Official Transports Quebec Road Network Map 
 Route 235 on Google Maps

235